Andressa Oliveira de Morais (born December 21, 1990) is a Brazilian athlete specializing in the discus throw. With a throw of 64.21 meters she achieved at the 2012 Ibero-American Championships she became the South American record holder.

In 2019, at Leiria, Portugal, she broke the South American record in Discus Throw, with a mark of 65.34.

At the 2019 Pan American Games, she won the silver medal in Discus Throw, breaking the South American record, with a mark of 65.98. It was reported she tested positive at the Games, and was later provisionally suspended.

She competed at the 2020 Summer Olympics.

Competition record

Personal bests
 Discus Throw – 65.34 (Leiria 2019)
 Hammer Throw – 58.89 (São Paulo 2012)

References

External links
 
 

1990 births
Living people
Brazilian female discus throwers
Brazilian female hammer throwers
Olympic athletes of Brazil
Athletes (track and field) at the 2012 Summer Olympics
Athletes (track and field) at the 2016 Summer Olympics
Athletes (track and field) at the 2015 Pan American Games
Athletes (track and field) at the 2019 Pan American Games
Pan American Games athletes for Brazil
World Athletics Championships athletes for Brazil
South American Games gold medalists for Brazil
South American Games silver medalists for Brazil
South American Games medalists in athletics
Competitors at the 2014 South American Games
Athletes (track and field) at the 2018 South American Games
South American Championships in Athletics winners
Ibero-American Championships in Athletics winners
South American Games gold medalists in athletics
Athletes (track and field) at the 2020 Summer Olympics
Sportspeople from Paraíba
20th-century Brazilian women
21st-century Brazilian women